Bridgwater War Memorial is a Grade II* listed war memorial located on King Square in Bridgwater, Somerset, England, on the site previously occupied by Bridgwater Castle. It was designed by John Angel in the mid-1920s. The green figure of the memorial is allegorical, representing "Civilization as a seated female, holding a globe in one hand and with the book of knowledge on her lap."

Description
John Angel sculpted the Angel of Bridgwater. Mounted on a plinth, a female figure of 'Civilisation' lofts the world, which is encircled by emblems of commerce and peace. Under her foot are the "demons of war." The throne and figure are backed by "relief depictions of Labour, Home, Life and Education." On her lap is a book of laws, and she is surrounded by children. Indeed, given its monumental breadth, the many details in the design, and its metaphorical and iconic form, the sculpture is subject to colorful and variant interpretations and description. The bronze was cast by W Morris Art Bronze Foundry.

At the time, Angel was working four years as assistant to Sir George Frampton, and Frampton's influence is apparent.  Figures from the roughly contemporaneous Exeter War Memorial, specifically "Peace" (also known as Victory) were exhibited by Angel at The Royal Academy in 1922, being exhibited in the courtyard of Burlington House, as were other studies of the Bridgwater War Memorial on several occasions.

On the third step these words are inscribed: "IN HONOUR OF THE MEN OF BRIDGWATER WHO GAVE THEIR LIVES IN THE GREAT WAR 1914-1918"

The memorial was unveiled by General the Earl of Cavan then Chief of the Imperial General Staff on 25 September 1924, to commemorate the fallen of World War I. Further names have been added following World War II, the Korean War. Falklands Conflict and the Afghan conflict.  It has been characterised as, "An exceptionally fine and moving memorial, which forms an important focal point to this fine late Georgian square."

In 2009 the memorial benefited from a small stipend from War Memorials Trust, which was used to replace bronze plaques and add a new one. The new plaques are said to be a precise match in form and typeface for those that were replaced.

See also
World War I memorials
Grade II* listed war memorials in England

Bibliography

Footnotes

References

External links

Photos of the dedication of the memorial, and memorial Roll of Honor

Monuments and memorials in Somerset
Bridgwater
Buildings and structures completed in 1924
Grade II* listed buildings in Sedgemoor
British military memorials and cemeteries
Bronze sculptures in the United Kingdom
World War I memorials in England
World War II memorials in England
Grade II* listed monuments and memorials
1924 establishments in England